Full Frequency is the sixth studio album by Jamaican dancehall singer Sean Paul, released through Atlantic Records. The album was originally planned for release on 4 November 2013, but was later pushed back to a release date of 18 February 2014.

Boasting a blend of dancehall, hip hop and pop styles, the album features guest appearances from Damian Marley, Iggy Azalea, Nyla Of Brick & Lace, Konshens, Nicki Minaj, 2 Chainz, Juicy J and writing from MNDR.

The album debuted at number one on the Billboard Reggae Albums chart and was nominated at the 57th Annual Grammy Awards for Best Reggae Album.

This was the final album for Sean Paul under Atlantic Records before his departure to Universal's Island Records.

Singles
The first single off the album "Other Side of Love" was released to iTunes on 10 September 2013. Its official music video was released on 31 July 2013.
The second single "Entertainment" which features 2 Chainz and Juicy J was released on 25 June 2013. Sean released an official remix for "Entertainment" on 10 October 2013 with an additional feature from Nicki Minaj.
"Turn It Up" was released as a single in the UK on 30 October 2013. It will be released in Germany on 22 November 2013.
"Want Dem All" was released as a single in the U.S. on 15 November 2013.

Track listing

Charts

Weekly charts

Year-end charts

References

Sean Paul albums
2014 albums
Atlantic Records albums
VP Records albums
Albums produced by Maejor
Albums produced by the Cataracs
Albums produced by Benny Blanco
Albums produced by Stargate